The Royal Canadian Postal Corps (RCPC) was an administrative corps of the Canadian Army. The Canadian Postal Corps was redesignated The Royal Canadian Postal Corps on 20 June 1961. The badge of The Royal Canadian Postal Corps consists of a horn, with a Queen's Crown on top. Superimposed at the center of the horn is the text RCPC. At the bottom the text "Servire Armatis" is written on a ribbon.

Unification
When the Army, Royal Canadian Navy, and Royal Canadian Air Force were merged in 1968 to form the Canadian Forces, the administrative Corps of the Army were deactivated and merged with their Naval and Air Force counterparts to form the Canadian Forces' personnel branches.

The Royal Canadian Postal Corps, Royal Canadian Army Service Corps clerical trades, and Royal Canadian Army Pay Corps were merged to form the Administration Branch (later merged with the Logistics Branch).

Notable members
 Father David Bauer (1924–1988), Basilian priest, founder of the Canada men's national ice hockey team and inductee into the Hockey Hall of Fame

References

Administrative corps of the Canadian Army
Army units and formations of Canada in World War I
Army units and formations of Canada in World War II
Military units and formations established in 1914
1914 establishments in Canada
Military mail
Postal history of Canada